Bernard Taylor may refer to:

Bernard Taylor (author) (born 1934), British horror and suspense author
Bernard Taylor, Baron Taylor of Mansfield (1895–1991), British coalminer and politician
Bernard Taylor (boxer) (born 1957), American boxer
Bernard Taylor (Medal of Honor) (1844–1875), American soldier
Bernard J. Taylor, South African writer and composer of stage musicals